Sindhooram is a 1976 Indian Malayalam film, directed by Jeassy. The film stars Jayabharathi, Sudheer, Vincent and M. G. Soman in the lead roles. The film has musical score by A. T. Ummer.

Cast
 
Jayabharathi 
Rani Chandra 
Sudheer 
Vincent
KPAC Lalitha 
Sankaradi 
M. G. Soman 
Mala Aravindan 
Mallika Sukumaran

Soundtrack
The music was composed by A. T. Ummer and the lyrics were written by Appan Thacheth, Sathyan Anthikkad, Bharanikkavu Sivakumar, Konniyoor Bhas and Sasikala Menon.

References

External links
 

1976 films
1970s Malayalam-language films